Rafał Pawlak (born 16 January 1970 in Poland) is a Polish retired footballer.

References

Polish footballers
Living people
Association football midfielders
1970 births
ŁKS Łódź players
Śląsk Wrocław players
Widzew Łódź players
Pogoń Szczecin players
Ionikos F.C. players
Footballers from Łódź
Polish football managers
Widzew Łódź managers